Pat Carter (born August 1, 1966) is a former American football player, active from 1988 to 1998.  After graduating from Florida State University, Carter played tight end for the Detroit Lions, the Los Angeles and St. Louis Rams, the Houston Oilers, and the Arizona Cardinals.

Pat Carter entered his third NFL season with Head Coach Rod Marinelli’s coaching staff. He returned to Detroit as the Lions’ tight ends coach in 2006 after originally being drafted as a tight end out of Florida State by the Lions in the second round (32nd overall) of the 1988 NFL Draft.

Before joining the Lions staff, Carter served as an offensive assistant in St. Louis for the 2005 season after working as a coaching intern for the Rams in 2004.

After playing his rookie season with the Lions (1988), Carter moved on to spend the bulk of his pro career with the Rams (1989–93, 1995) after he was traded by the Lions to the Rams in August 1989 for a fourth-round pick in the 1990 draft. He also played one season with the Houston Oilers (1994) and finished his 10-year career with Arizona (1996–97). Carter, who earned first-team All-America honors by The Sporting News as a senior at Florida State, played in 154 NFL games and had 107 career receptions for 1,117 yards and nine touchdowns. His best pro season was in 1996 when he registered 26 receptions for 329 yards and a touchdown with the Cardinals.

References

External links
Detroit Lions

1966 births
Living people
Sportspeople from Sarasota, Florida
American football tight ends
Florida State Seminoles football players
Detroit Lions players
Los Angeles Rams players
Houston Oilers players
St. Louis Rams players
Arizona Cardinals players